Gutchess College was a business college in Bridgeport, Connecticut, USA. It was founded as Brown's Business College in 1896 with a focus on typing, stenography, telegraphy and bookkeeping. It was later purchased by Stephen D. Gutchess who in 1911 was operating the school with an annual enrollment of about 500. It was still operating in 1920.

References

Bridgeport Public Library Historical Collections: "Typewriters? Shorthand? How Times Have Changed", January 14, 2009
 Patterson's American Education, (1921) vol. 17, p. 837

Defunct private universities and colleges in Connecticut
Educational institutions established in 1896
Education in Bridgeport, Connecticut
1896 establishments in Connecticut